Dholka is one of the 182 Legislative Assembly constituencies of Gujarat state in India. It is part of Ahmedabad district.

List of segments
This assembly seat represents the following segments,

 Dholka Taluka
 Bavla Taluka (Part) Villages – Kavitha, Rasam, Rupal, Saljada, Juval Rupavati, Zekda, Chiyada, Sakodara, Dhanwada, Bhayla, Kalyangadh, Bhamsara, Gangad, Rohika, Bagodara, Gundanapara, Memar, Dhingda.

Members of Legislative Assembly
2007 - Kanjibhai Talpada, Indian National Congress 
2012 - Bhupendrasinh Chudasama, Bharatiya Janata Party

Election results

2022

2017

2012

See also
 List of constituencies of the Gujarat Legislative Assembly
 Ahmedabad district

References

External links
 

Assembly constituencies of Gujarat
Ahmedabad district